is a former Japanese football player.

Playing career
Kaetsu was born in Kumamoto Prefecture on October 8, 1974. After graduating from high school, he joined the Yokohama Flügels in 1993. Although he debuted as forward in 1995, he did not play often and left the club at the end of the 1996 season. In 1998, he joined the Prefectural Leagues club Tochigi SC. The club was promoted to the Regional Leagues in 1999. In 2000, he moved to the Regional Leagues club Sagawa Express Tokyo. The club was promoted to the Japan Football League in 2001. In 2005, he moved to his local club Rosso Kumamoto in the Regional Leagues. He retired at the end of the 2005 season.

Club statistics

References

External links

1974 births
Living people
Association football people from Kumamoto Prefecture
Japanese footballers
J1 League players
Japan Football League players
Yokohama Flügels players
Tochigi SC players
Sagawa Shiga FC players
Roasso Kumamoto players
Association football forwards